The Regional Federal Courts (in Portuguese, Tribunais Regionais Federais, commonly called TRFs) are the courts of appeal of . They represent the second instance courts of the Brazilian Federal Justice system and are responsible not only for appeal processes against trial court decisions, but also for writs of security, Habeas corpus, and Habeas data against acts by federal judges, motions to set aside judgments, criminal revisions, and conflicts of jurisdiction. 

The jurisdiction of the Federal Regional Courts is defined in Article 108 of the Brazilian Constitution. 

The Federal Regional Courts have a varied composition, with the number of judges defined by law, where one fifth are chosen by lawyers with 10 years experience or more, as well as by members of the Public Prosecutor’s Office with 10 years experience or more. The rest of the judges are appointed through the promotion of federal judges with over five years experience, by longest service time and by merit, alternately.

In each tribunal, there is an Internal Affairs of the Federal Justice office, responsible for corrections, inspections, and investigations at first instance. The internal affairs offices are also in charge of hiring processes, and instruction towards a uniformization of jurisdictional activity and forensic service. They are each run by a Regional Director, with a possible Vice-Director.

Federal Justice Regions

The Brazilian Federal Justice system is divided nationally into five geographically defined regions, each served by an appellate court:

 Regional Federal Court of the 1st Region — Tribunal Regional Federal da 1ª Região (TRF-1)
 Seated in Brasília, Federal District, this appellate court covers the states of Acre, Amapá, Amazonas, Bahia, Goiás, Maranhão, Minas Gerais, Mato Grosso, Pará, Piauí, Rondônia, Roraima and Tocantins, as well as the Federal District.

 Regional Federal Court of the 2nd Region — Tribunal Regional Federal da 2ª Região (TRF-2)
 Seated in Rio de Janeiro, Rio de Janeiro, this appellate court covers the states of Espírito Santo and Rio de Janeiro.

 Regional Federal Court of the 3rd Region — Tribunal Regional Federal da 3ª Região (TRF-3)
 Seated in São Paulo, São Paulo, this appellate court covers the states of Mato Grosso do Sul and São Paulo.

 Regional Federal Court of the 4th Region — Tribunal Regional Federal da 4ª Região (TRF-4)

 Seated in Porto Alegre, Rio Grande do Sul, this appellate court covers the states of Paraná, Rio Grande do Sul and Santa Catarina.

 Regional Federal Court of the 5th Region — Tribunal Regional Federal da 5ª Região (TRF-5)
 Seated in Recife, Pernambuco, this appellate court covers the states of Alagoas, Ceará, Paraíba, Pernambuco, Rio Grande do Norte and Sergipe.

New courts

The creation of four new courts was approved by Congress by Constitutional Amendment number 73/2013.
However, the National Association of Federal Prosecutors proposed a direct action of unconstitutionality against the creation of new courts; The former president of the Supreme Federal Court, Minister Joaquim Barbosa, suspended the constitutional amendment until the fore-mentioned direct action is judged.

The new tribunals, whose installations have been suspended by the Supreme Federal Court, are planned as:
 TRF for the 6th Region – headquartered in Curitiba: would entail the jurisdictions of the following states: Santa Catarina and Paraná, currently linked to the TRF for the 4th Region, and Mato Grosso do Sul, previously linked to the TRF for the 3rd Region.
 TRF for the 7th Region - headquartered in Belo Horizonte: would entail the jurisdiction of Minas Gerais, previously linked to the TRF for the 1st Region.
 TRF for the 8th Region - headquartered in Salvador: would entail the jurisdiction of Bahia, previously linked to the TRF for the 1st Region, and Sergipe, previously linked to the TRF for the 5th Region.
 TRF for the 9th Region - headquartered in Manaus: would entail the jurisdictions of the following states: Amazonas, Acre, Rondônia and Roraima, all previously linked to the TRF for the 1st Region.

See also
Federal institutions of Brazil

External links
 http://www.trf1.jus.br
 http://www.trf2.jus.br
 http://www.trf3.jus.br
 http://www.trf4.jus.br
 http://www.trf5.jus.br

Judiciary of Brazil